Keith Griffin may refer to:

 Keith Griffin (economist) (born 1938), British economist
 Keith Griffin (American football) (born 1961), former American football running back

See also
Griffin (surname)
Keith Griffith (born 1947), footballer from Barbados
Keith Griffiths (disambiguation)